Eudoro Galarza Ossa (Caramanta, 1895 – Manizales, October 12, 1938) was a Colombian journalist. He was editor-in-chief of the newspaper La Voz de Caldas. He was assassinated by Lieutenant Jesús María Cortés Poveda and is often considered 'the first Colombian journalist assassinated'. Represented by Jorge Eliécer Gaitán as his lawyer, Cortés Poveda was absolved after ten years.

The Foundation for Press Freedom considers Galarza Ossa's "the first murder of a journalist for reasons of his work of which there is a record in Colombia". By 2018, the historical number of journalists killed for reasons related to their work in Colombia was estimated in 155.

Further reading 

 Adriana Villegas Botero, "The History of Eudoro Galarza Ossa, the first journalist assassinated in Colombia" (2020), Escribanía, 15(1). https://revistasum.umanizales.edu.co/ojs/index.php/escribania/article/view/2550

References 

Colombian journalists
Male journalists
1895 births
20th-century journalists
1938 deaths